Oro Bay Airfield (also known as Cape Sudest Airfield) is a former World War II airfield in Oro Province, Papua New Guinea. The airfield was abandoned after the war and today is almost totally returned to its natural state.

History
Oro Bay Airfield was primarily an emergency landing field, although it was briefly used as a  headquarters base for the 308th Bombardment Wing (1 February-2 July 1944) and as an operational airfield for the 417th Bombardment Group (28 January-4 February 1944) which flew A-20 Havocs. Operational squadrons assigned to the airfield were:
 672d Bombardment Squadron: 28 January-4 February 1944
 673d Bombardment Squadron: 28 January-4 February 1944
 674th Bombardment Squadron: 28 January-4 February 1944

In addition, the 547th Night Fighter Squadron flew a night fighter variant of the P-38 Lightning and P-61 Black Widow from the airfield (5 September-6 October 1944).

See also

 USAAF in the Southwest Pacific

References

 Maurer, Maurer (1983). Air Force Combat Units Of World War II. Maxwell AFB, Alabama: Office of Air Force History. .
 www.pacificwrecks.com

External links

Airfields of the United States Army Air Forces in Papua New Guinea
Airports established in 1944